Warp20 (Recreated) is a compilation album released by Warp Records in 2009. It contains covers of Warp artists, such as Aphex Twin, LFO, Boards of Canada and Grizzly Bear, by other Warp artists, such as Plaid, Autechre and Mira Calix. Warp20 (Recreated) was released as part of the Warp20 box set, released to commemorate the label's 20th anniversary.

Track listing

The Japanese edition, released on Beat Records, includes the bonus track "Hey! Hey! Can U Relate?" by Nightmares on Wax (original by DJ Mink) on the second disc.

References

External links
 Warp20 (Recreated) at the official Warp Records website

Covers albums
2009 compilation albums
Warp (record label) compilation albums